, formerly known as ZUN Soft, is a Japanese dōjin game developer. Since 1995, the sole member of the group, Jun'ya "ZUN" Ōta, has independently developed and self-published the Touhou Project, a bullet hell shoot 'em up series, as well as collaborated with other circles to produce related print works and music albums.

Name
"ZUN Soft" was originally created as a generic developer name for each Touhou Project game. After Touhou's PC-98 era, ZUN changed the name of the team to "Shanghai Alice". According to ZUN, this name was chosen to fit the overall theme of the Touhou Project. "Shanghai", to him, is a multicultural city where Western and Oriental styles meet, and "Alice" evokes a feminine or gothic lolita feeling. "Fantasy Ensemble" (幻樂団 Gengakudan) stems from ZUN's unsuccessful attempt to register the group as a music circle for Comiket 61 in December 2001; he decided to keep the name while applying as a game circle for Comiket 62, where he would release Embodiment of Scarlet Devil.

Productions

Games

As ZUN Soft:

As Team Shanghai Alice:

Music CDs
ZUN's Music Collection

Akyu's Untouched Score

Collaborations with Twilight Frontier

Member

Team Shanghai Alice consists of a single member, ZUN, who serves as the programmer, writer, artist, and composer for the group's productions. He was born on March 18, 1977, in Hakuba, Nagano, and is well known among fans for his fondness of beer and his penchant for wearing flat caps. He has sometimes playfully referred to himself as the "Hakurei Kannushi" (博麗神主,  "head priest of the Hakurei Shrine"). In 2012, ZUN revealed that he had recently married a programmer, with whom he has 2 children.

His interest in creating music began in elementary school, when his parents gifted him an Electone as a birthday present. In junior high school, he played the trumpet in a brass band and began composing his own music.  In 1995, he began developing a series of bullet hell video games under the name "ZUN Soft" while studying mathematics at Tokyo Denki University. The games, which would become the first five entries in the Touhou Project series, were developed for NEC PC-9800 personal computers and published by Amusement Makers, a student video game development club:

After graduating in 1999, ZUN was hired by as a video game programmer by Taito. He is credited in the production of several titles:
 (PlayStation 2, 2000)
Magic Pengel (PlayStation 2, 2002)
Bujingai (PlayStation 2, 2003)
Graffiti Kingdom (PlayStation 2, 2004)
Exit (PlayStation Portable, 2005)

(瞬殺サレ道？). The series was intended as a counterpart to the Touhou Project, featuring highly similar gameplay as well as cameo appearances by Reimu Hakurei, Marisa Kirisame, and Yuuka Kazami:
 - part of the Seihou Project
 - a bullet hell game by Pietoro (ぴえとろ) based on the manga 
 - part of the Seihou Project
 - a collection of six MIDI tracks for the Roland SC-88 Pro, including unused music from Shuusou Gyoku

In 2007, he left his job at Taito to focus on the development of the Touhou Project. The game uses the same engine as Mountain of Faith and shares many similar gameplay features, including a "Beer Gauge" that increases shot power based on damage dealt.

In addition to the Touhou Project games, ZUN has provided writing for several official Touhou Project print works, produced in collaboration with various illustrators and publishers:

, which consists of:
Eastern and Little Nature Deity (2005–2006)
Strange and Bright Nature Deity (2006–2009)
Oriental Sacred Place (2009–2012)
Visionary Fairies in Shrine (2016–2019)

, which consists of:
Silent Sinner in Blue (2007–2009)
Cage in Lunatic Runagate (2007–2009)

The releases of Bohemian Archive in Japanese Red, Perfect Memento in Strict Sense, Strange Creators of Outer World Volume 2, and The Grimoire of Marisa were accompanied by bonus CDs containing arrangements and compositions by ZUN. Additional CDs were included with several tankōbon releases of official manga: Eastern and Little Nature Deity (2007), Strange and Bright Nature Deity (2008, 2009, 2009), Silent Sinner in Blue (2008), Oriental Sacred Place (2010, 2011, 2012), and Forbidden Scrollery (2016).

Rarely, ZUN has collaborated in the production of unofficial Touhou works, creating tracks for two fangames and four dōjin albums:
 - album by sound sepher
 - compilation album by Comic Toranoana, included with Seasonal Dream Vision fanbook
 - shoot 'em up game by D.N.A.Softwares
 - mahjong game by D.N.A.Softwares
 - album by Disaster and D.N.A.Softwares
 - album by Columbus Circle

Since December 2009, ZUN has written the monthly column , in which he discusses his favorite locations for food and beer, his daily life, game development, and topics related to the Touhou Project. The columns are often accompanied by photos and/or guest artist illustrations; it was serialized in Comptiq magazine until July 2013, and in Comp Ace since September 2013.

References

External links
 Team Shanghai Alice - official website 
 Invisible Games and Japanese - ZUN's blog 
 @korindo - ZUN's Twitter account 

Doujin music
Doujin soft developers
Touhou Project
Video game companies of Japan
Video game development companies